Empire Blessing was a cargo ship which was built in 1943 by Bartram & Sons Ltd, Sunderland. She was built for the Ministry of War Transport (MoWT) and operated under the management of W Runciman & Co Ltd. In March 1945, Empire Blessing struck a mine in the River Scheldt and sank.

Description
Empire Blessing was a  cargo ship. She was built by Bartram & Sons Ltd, Sunderland, as yard number 298. The ship was launched on 1 October 1943 and completed in January 1944. It was manufactured by Worthington Simpson Ltd, Newark-on-Trent.

Career
Empire Blessing was a member of a number of convoys during the Second World War.

ON 220
Convoy ON 220 sailed from Loch Ewe on 15 January 1944, bound for Canada and the United States. Empire Blessing set off in the convoy, but returned to Loch Ewe.

ONS 29
Convoy ONS 29 sailed from Oban on 13 February 1944, bound for Canada and the United States.

HX 291
Convoy HX 291 departed Halifax, Nova Scotia on 10 May 1944 and arrived at Liverpool on 27 May. Empire Blessing was carrying a cargo of sugar and was bound for the Inverness Firth to await further orders.

Empire Blessing was involved in the Normandy Landings in June 1944. On 19 March 1945, Empire Blessing struck a mine in the River Scheldt at Knocke, Belgium and sank. On 13 February 1954,  (formerly Empire Seablue) struck the wreck of Empire Blessing and was holed.

Official Numbers and Code Letters

Official Numbers were a forerunner to IMO Numbers. Empire Blessing had the UK Official Number 180054 and used the Code Letters GCTW.

References

1943 ships
Ships built on the River Wear
Steamships of the United Kingdom
Empire ships
Ministry of War Transport ships
Ships sunk by mines
Shipwrecks in the North Sea
Maritime incidents in March 1945